Whistler (Lillooet/Ucwalmícwts: Cwitima, ; Squamish/Sḵwx̱wú7mesh: Sḵwiḵw) is a resort municipality in Squamish-Lillooet Regional District, British Columbia, Canada. It has a permanent population of approximately 13,982 (2021), as well as a larger but rotating population of seasonal workers.

Over two million people visit Whistler annually, primarily for alpine skiing and snowboarding and, in the summer, mountain biking at Whistler Blackcomb. Its pedestrian village has won numerous design awards, and Whistler has been voted among the top destinations in North America by major ski magazines since the mid-1990s. During the 2010 Winter Olympics, Whistler hosted most of the alpine, Nordic, luge, skeleton, and bobsled events.

History 

The Whistler Valley is located around the pass between the headwaters of the Green River and the upper-middle reaches of the Cheakamus. It is flanked by glaciated mountains on both sides; the Garibaldi Ranges on the side that contains the ski mountains, and a group of ranges with no collective name but that are part of the larger Pacific Ranges and are essentially fore-ranges of the Pemberton Icefield. Although there are a few other routes through the maze of mountains between the basin of the Lillooet River just east, the Cheakamus-Green divide is the lowest and most direct.

Indigenous settlement
Before Whistler was founded, it was the shared ancestral territories of the indigenous Squamish people (Sk̲wx̲wú7mesh), known in English as the Squamish Nation, and L̓il̓wat7úl, known in English as Lil'wat First Nation (originally Srap7úl). Their history is tied to the rivers, lakes, and mountains that were used as reference for direction and travel. In the Late Pleistocene era, long before European settlement, Sk̲wx̲wú7mesh and L̓il̓wat7ú shared a village known as Spo7ez "at the confluence of Rubble Creek and the Cheakamus River at Function Junction in Whistler." This location represents the long-standing relationship of the two nations who used Spo7ez as a hub of trade and commerce between the two nations. Spo7ez was buried after Black Tusk Volcano erupted causing a massive rockslide that buried the ancient village under hundreds of metres of rubble. From this point forward both Nations continued to co-habitat within the region travelling to the area in the warmer months where they established seasonal camps for hunting and trapping. Prior to settlement of the first European fishing and trapping communities L̓il̓wat7ú Nation members lived in camps along green lake, but were rousted by police in order to make way for the rail way and other infrastructure around the lake. Evidence was found of an Istken pit-house on the land that became the Squamish Lil’wat Cultural Centre, which was used by the Wolf Clan (now known as the Wallace Family) as shelter.

European settlement

The first British survey by the Royal Navy took place in the 1860s. These surveyors named the mountain London Mountain because of the heavy fog and cloud typically gathering around the mountain, but the area informally acquired the name "Whistler" due to the call of the hoary marmot. In the late 19th century, a trail was cut through the valley, linking Lillooet via Pemberton with Burrard Inlet via a pass from Squamish to the Seymour River. The trail was completed in 1877, but because of the difficult and unforgiving terrain, it was only used once for its intended purpose, which was to drive cattle. The area began to attract trappers and prospectors (such as John Millar and Henry Horstman) who established small camps in the area in the early 20th century. The area began to gain recognition with the arrival of Myrtle and Alex Philip, who in 1914 purchased  of land on Alta Lake and established the Rainbow Lodge. The Philips had relocated from Maine to Vancouver in 1910 and had heard rumours of the natural beauty of the area from Pemberton pioneer John Millar. After an exploratory journey, the couple was convinced. Rainbow Lodge and other railway-dependent tourist resorts were collectively known as Alta Lake. Along with the rest of the valley bridging the Cheakamus and Green River basins, they became part of British Columbia's first Resort Municipality in 1975.

Completion of the Pacific Great Eastern Railway in 1914 greatly reduced the travel time from three days, providing ease of access from Vancouver, and the Rainbow Lodge gained a reputation as the most popular vacation destination west of the Rockies. The lodge was primarily a summer destination, with boating, fishing and hiking among the most popular activities, and soon other lodges began to open not just on Alta Lake, but on other valley lakes as well.

Appreciation of the outdoors was not the only activity in the valley, however. Logging was a booming industry. During the first half of the 20th century, most of the lower slopes of the surrounding mountains were cleared of old-growth. At its peak, four mills were in operation, most located around Green Lake. Prospecting and trapping were pursued as well, though no claims of great value were ever staked.

Demographics 

Ethnicity

Religion 
According to the 2021 census, religious groups in Whistler included:
Irreligion (9,755 persons or 72.7%)
Christianity (3,280 persons or 24.4%)
Judaism (145 persons or 1.1%)
Buddhism (75 persons or 0.6%)
Islam (50 persons or 0.4%)
Indigenous Spirituality (10 persons or 0.1%)
Other (95 persons or 0.7%)

Insignia 
The resort town was granted heraldic symbols by the Canadian Heraldic Authority in January 2016.

Activities 
Whistler is known for its skiing and snowboarding in the winter and mountain biking and hiking in the summer. Other winter activities that are enjoyed in Whistler are cross country skiing, skate skiing, ice skating, snowshoeing, backcountry skiing, telemark skiing, and tobogganing. Summer activities enjoyed in Whistler include golfing, fishing, trail running, mountain biking, outdoor yoga, and hiking.

For skiing, arguably the main attraction of Whistler, the different run difficulties (easiest to hardest) are green (circle), blue (square), black (diamond), and double black (diamond). Throughout the year each run's difficulty stays the same. There are many signs around the mountain that indicate the difficulty of the runs and there are "expert only" signs at the bottom of some chairlifts indicating that most of the runs accessible from that chair are black diamonds or double black diamonds.

1968 and 1976 Winter Olympic bids 
Until the 1960s, this quiet area was without basic infrastructure. There were no sewage facilities, water, or electricity, and no road from Squamish or Vancouver. In 1962, four Vancouver businessmen began to explore the area with the intent of building a ski resort and bidding for the 1968 Winter Olympics. Garibaldi Lift Company was formed, shares were sold, and in 1966, Whistler Mountain opened to the public.

Later, the town, then still known as Alta Lake, was offered the 1976 Winter Olympics after the selected host city Denver declined the games due to funding issues. Alta Lake Whistler declined as well, after elections ushered in a local government less enthusiastic about the Olympics. The 1976 Winter Olympics were ultimately held in Innsbruck, Austria.

2010 Winter Olympics 

Whistler was the Host Mountain Resort of the Vancouver 2010 Winter Olympics and Paralympic Games, the first time the International Olympic Committee has bestowed that designation on a community. Whistler hosted the alpine technical and speed events, the sliding events at Fitzsimmons Creek, the Nordic events in the nearby Callaghan Valley and all the Paralympic events except the opening ceremonies, sledge hockey and wheelchair curling.

The Whistler Olympic and Paralympic Village (commonly referred to as the Athlete's village) housed around 2,400 athletes, coaches, trainers and officials. Post-games, the site has been turned into a new residential neighbourhood, Cheakamus Crossing.

Transportation 
The highway connects Whistler to the British Columbia Interior via Pemberton-Mount Currie to Lillooet and connections beyond to the Trans-Canada and Cariboo Highways.

Passenger rail service is only provided at the Whistler railway station between Vancouver and Jasper by the Rocky Mountaineer, using Canadian National Railway tracks from North Vancouver via Whistler and Prince George. The station for tour passengers embarking from Whistler is in the Southside area, between Nita and Alpha Lakes.

Local bus transit service is provided by the Whistler and Valley Express, which also provides service to Pemberton.

A shuttle bus service from the Vancouver Airport and Downtown Vancouver is provided by the Whistler Shuttle and YVR Skylynx.

Vancouver International Airport 

Pemberton Regional Airport 
Pemberton Regional Airport  is a public airport serving Pemberton and Whistler. It is the closest airport for fixed-wing non-amphibious aircraft and is 38 minutes north of Whistler. There are no scheduled flights but three charter services operate out of the airport.

Whistler (Municipal) Heliport 
Whistler (Municipal) Heliport  is a public heliport operated by the Whistler Heliport Society. Currently there are no scheduled flights but charter services to/from Vancouver International Airport, Vancouver/Harbour (Public) Heliport and Victoria Harbour (Camel Point) Heliport  are available.

Whistler/Green Lake Water Aerodrome 
Whistler/Green Lake Water Aerodrome  is a public floatplane base owned and operated by Harbour Air Group and Whistler Air. Seasonal scheduled flights are provided by Harbour Air Seaplanes and West Coast Air to Victoria Inner Harbour Airport and Vancouver Harbour Water Airport. The seaplane base is located at the Nicklaus North subdivision on the South end of Green Lake.

Directions 
South of the village is Squamish, British Columbia, about a  drive.

Climate 
Whistler has a humid continental climate (Köppen climate classification Dfb) or an oceanic climate (Köppen Cfb) depending on the isotherm used. It has cold wet winters with significant snowfall and cloud cover, and warm summers which are somewhat dry.

Flora 
Whistler is a collection of microclimates ranging from coniferous mixed forest on the valley floor, to slightly drier slopes, to Alpine tundra in the alpine.

The wet West Coast marine temperate climate in the valley floor is characterized by a coniferous mixed forest, with a preponderance of western red cedar—a continuation of the rainforest of the Pacific Northwest.

The slopes are slightly drier and are also coniferous mixed forest with western hemlock (Tsuga heterophylla) and mountain hemlock (Tsuga mertensiana), Whistler hybrid spruce (Sitka spruce and Engelmann spruce). The last is "a hybrid spruce that is unique to Whistler, aptly dubbed the "Whistler Spruce." The Whistler spruce hybrid is indicative of Whistler's geographic position—we're not quite coastal, but not quite interior". A hybrid of the wetter West Coast Sitka spruce (Picea sitchensis) – that ranges from Northern California to Alaska and the drier Interior Engelmann spruce (Picea engelmannii). Others include the Douglas fir (Pseudotsuga menziesii), lodgepole pine (Pinus contorta), endangered whitebark pine (Pinus albicaulis).

The higher slopes transition to many species of scrub juniper, Rocky Mountain Juniper (Juniperus scopulorum), and many species of scrub willow in the genus Salix at the tree line, and to Arctic tundra like conditions in the high alpine above the tree line.

Both the valley floor and the mountain sides are characterized as mixed forest, predominantly conifers, but with a peppering of a few deciduous trees like the Pacific dogwood (Cornus nuttallii), locally extinct Pacific crabapple (Malus fusca) or Pryus fusca, bitter cherry (Prunus emarginata), pin cherry (Prunus pensylvanica), choke cherry (Prunus virginiana), Red Alder (Alnus rubra), Sitka Alder (Alnus sinuata), Paper Birch (Betula papyrifera), big leaf maple (Acer macrophyllum), Douglas maple (Acer glabrum)

Whistler was clear cut twice. The Oregon Grape Mahonia aquifolium (AKA hollyleaved barberry) USDA Plants Database and Highbush Cranberry Viburnum opulus were accidentally re-introduced as escaped landscaping plants, and may all be Oregonian subspecies. All the wild Pacific crabapples were dug up by Pemberton Pioneers for grafting Rootstock. It is unclear whether the Chickasaw Plum, Prunus americana was indigenous, or introduced by Indigenous Transcontinental Trade Networks or later Western Contact. All the wild Plums were dug up too by Pemberton Pioneers for fruit trees to transplant and as rootstock. Once abundant on the forest floor, Lingonberry Vaccinium vitis-idaea is no longer found because of the loss of habitat through the clear-cutting.

Education 
The School District 48 Sea to Sky operates public schools in Whistler. There are two elementary schools, Myrtle Phillip Elementary and Spring Creek Elementary. There is one high school in the community, it is named Whistler Secondary School.

The Conseil scolaire francophone de la Colombie-Britannique operates one Francophone primary school in that city: the école La Passerelle.

Media

Print media 
Whistler has one weekly newspaper, Pique Newsmagazine, published every Thursday. The Whistler Answer was published intermittently from 1977 to the 1990s. The Lost Duck is a monthly events guide and calendar that lists what is happening in the resort. Other tourist-oriented, print media such as FAQ, Visitors Choice and Whistler Magazine are published from quarterly to once or twice a year.

Radio 

An internet radio site for the community exists It is designed to be a community radio station showcasing local music talent and interests of relative importance. History: 28 November 2003, "Feds shut down local pirate radio station... frequency 105.5 FM in the Whistler area, received a visit from Industry Canada and local RCMP officer", Federal Police. Freeradio Whistler still legally broadcasts over the Internet at freewhistler.com.

Television 

The incumbent cable television provider in Whistler is Shaw Cable. Additional service providers covering Whistler include Telus TV (Optik IPTV service and Telus Satellite TV), Shaw Direct (satellite), and Bell Satellite TV (satellite).

Whistler was previously served by CBUWT-TV channel 13, a CBC Television repeater of CBUT-DT (Vancouver); that station shut down in 2012 due to budget cuts affecting the CBC.

In Media 
The television show Whistler takes place in Whistler. Whistler, the series is a Canadian television drama centering on the aftermath of the mysterious death of a local snowboard legend. The series was set in the ski resort of the same name and aired for two seasons from 2006 to 2008. It was created by Kelly Senecal and developed by Patrick Banister, John Barbisan, Mindy Heslin, and Susan James.

The television series Peak Season is filmed in Whistler and documents the lives of people that live there. Reality Show Fresh Meat II was filmed in Whistler. The community also appeared as the location for Shane and Carmen's wedding in The L Word (season 3, episode 12) Whistler was also featured on The Real Housewives of Orange County and ABC's Extreme Weight Loss.

Reality show Gene Simmons Family Jewels filmed some episodes in Whistler. It is an American reality television series that premiered on A&E on 7 August 2006. The show follows the life of Kiss bassist and vocalist Gene Simmons, his longtime partner and wife Shannon Tweed, and their two children, Nick and Sophie.

Sophie Tweed-Simmons has her own reality TV series spin off in production. Filming began December 2013, in Whistler, Vancouver, Los Angeles, and Nashville. Sophie and her mother, model Shannon Tweed, will be the focus of the new show. Producers of the show are Force Four Entertainment, Vancouver. Eight -hour episodes are to be broadcast on W Network Canada in the spring of 2014.

Kansai TV Japan was produced in Whistler with a -hour TV special, Race to the Canadian Northern Lights. Thirty minutes of footage on Whistler's winter activities, shopping, Village and spa. The show aired March 2001. It had a viewership of 3 million and had an estimated public relations value of $2 million.

Stewardess Cops Fuji Television AKA Fuji Network, a popular Japanese drama, shot a two-hour special on location in Whistler during the fall of 2001. It was aired January 2002 and had an estimated audience of 22 million.

Besides the 2010 Winter Olympics broadcasters from the United States, Australia's Today Show, and Japan have done daily up to week long segments from Whistler.

ESPN2 shows BMX Races from Whistler but they are really from nearby Pemberton's Green River BMX Track.

Most videos of Whistler Backcountry skiing, snowboarding, and snowmobiling are filmed in the Pemberton Valley or area. The Whistler name has a much higher brand recognition.

Movies 
The Whistler Film Festival is produced by the Whistler Film Festival Society (WFFS). It is held over five days from the first weekend of December.

The Crash Reel, a 2013 documentary and reality film, directed by Academy Award Nominee Lucy Walker, was filmed on location in Whistler. It features top-ranked American snowboarder Kevin Pearce, who because of injuries missed the 2010 Winter Olympics, dealing with his rival Shaun White. It was a selection for the Whistler Film Festival, the Montreal World Film Festival and the Sundance Film Festival.

Ski School, a 1991 comedy, with Dean Cameron, was filmed on location partially, in Whistler and on the mountain.

The X-Files: I Want to Believe (2008) used the glacier above the community to stand in for Antarctica.

Why Did I Get Married? (2008), which was directed, written and starred Tyler Perry, was shot on the slopes of Whistler Blackcomb ski resort.

White Fang 2: Myth of the White Wolf (1994) was directed by Ken Olin, and stars Scott Bairstow, Alfred Molina, Geoffrey Lewis and Ethan Hawke. Whistler is the back drop for this Disney film.

The Grey (2011), which was directed by Joe Carnahan. Liam Neeson sips cocktails in The Cure Bar at Whistler's Nita Lake Lodge.

The Twilight Saga: Breaking Dawn – Part 1 (2011) and The Twilight Saga: Breaking Dawn – Part 2 (2012) were not filmed in Whistler proper, but north and south of town. The crew was housed in Squamish and later Pemberton, but the stars were housed in Whistler hotels, hence the reason for all the star sightings in the village.

Gallery

See also 
 List of neighbourhoods in Whistler, British Columbia
 Blackcomb Peak
 Mount Cayley volcanic field
 Garibaldi Lake volcanic field

Notes

References

External links 

 
Resort municipalities in British Columbia
Populated places in the Squamish-Lillooet Regional District
1914 establishments in British Columbia